Malye Mayachki is a rural locality (a selo) and the administrative center of Malomayachenskoye Rural Settlement, Prokhorovsky District, Belgorod Oblast, Russia. The population was 445 as of 2010. There are 5 streets.

Geography 
Malye Mayachki is located 22 km southwest of Prokhorovka (the district's administrative centre) by road. Gryaznoye is the nearest rural locality.

References 

Rural localities in Prokhorovsky District